David Cañas Fernández (born 26 August 1978) is a Spanish retired professional footballer who played mainly as a central defender but also as a defensive midfielder.

Club career
Cañas was born in Castilleja de la Cuesta, Province of Seville. He played 13 games for hometown club Sevilla FC in the 1998–99 season, with the Andalusians in the Segunda División.

During his career, Cañas also represented Getafe CF, AD Ceuta (two spells, both in Segunda División B), Polideportivo Ejido, UD Salamanca, Albacete Balompié and Girona FC, appearing in 276 matches in the second tier of Spanish football over 11 seasons and scoring 12 goals. In early 2011 he was diagnosed with testicular cancer, being sidelined for 50 days for treatment but eventually returning to finish the campaign with Ceuta, following which he retired at the age of 32.

References

External links

1978 births
Living people
People from Seville (comarca)
Sportspeople from the Province of Seville
Spanish footballers
Footballers from Andalusia
Association football defenders
Association football utility players
Segunda División players
Segunda División B players
Sevilla Atlético players
Sevilla FC players
Getafe CF footballers
AD Ceuta footballers
Polideportivo Ejido footballers
UD Salamanca players
Albacete Balompié players
Girona FC players
Spain youth international footballers